In enzymology, a N-acetyl-beta-alanine deacetylase is an enzyme that catalyzes the chemical reaction

N-acetyl-beta-alanine + H2O  acetate + beta-alanine

Thus, the two substrates of this enzyme are N-acetyl-beta-alanine and H2O, whereas its two products are acetate and beta-alanine.

This enzyme belongs to the family of hydrolases, those acting on carbon-nitrogen bonds other than peptide bonds, specifically in linear amides.  The systematic name of this enzyme class is N-acetyl-beta-alanine amidohydrolase. This enzyme participates in beta-alanine metabolism.

References

 

EC 3.5.1
Enzymes of unknown structure